Simpson Park is a valley south of Grass Valley, Nevada that contained a Pony Express station location of Pony Express Division Four.

References

Landforms of Lander County, Nevada
Pony Express stations
Valleys of Nevada